Noah, also known as Nuh, is recognized in Islam as a prophet and messenger of God. He is one of the Ulu'l azm prophets. Noah's mission was to warn his people, who were plunged in depravity and sin. God charged Noah with the duty of preaching to his people, advising them to abandon idolatry and to worship only God and to live good and pure lives. Although he preached the Message of God with zeal, his people refused to mend their ways, leading to building the Ark and the Deluge, the Great Flood. In Islamic tradition, it is disputed whether the Great Flood was a global or a local one. Noah's preaching and prophethood spanned 950 years according to the Quran, Ahadith and Tafsir.

Noah's mission had a double character: he had to warn his people, asking them to call for repentance and, at the same time, he had to preach about God's mercy and forgiveness, promising them the glad tidings God would provide if they led righteous lives. References to Noah are scattered throughout the Qur'an, and there is even an entire sura carrying his name, Nūḥ.

In the Quran

Praise

Noah is praised by God in the Quran, which shows his great status amongst the prophets. In the Quran 17:3, God states: "Verily he was a devotee most grateful." Also, from the Qur'an which states:

And also in the Quran 3:33, it states: "God did choose Adam and Noah, the family of Abraham and the family of 'Imran above all people,-"

Story
The Quran states that Noah was inspired by God, like other prophets such as Ibrāhīm (Abraham), Ismā'īl (Ishmael), Ishaq (Isaac), Ya'qub (Jacob), Isa (Jesus), Ilyas (Elijah), Ayyub (Job), Harun (Aaron), Yunus (Jonah), Dawud (David) and Muhammad, and that he was a faithful messenger. Noah had firm belief in the oneness of God, and preached Islam (literally "submission," meaning submission to God).

He continuously warned the people of the painful doom that was coming and asked them to accept one God instead of worshipping idols such as Wadd, Suwa', Yaghuth, Ya'uq and Nasr. He called the people to serve God, and said that nobody but God could save them. He said that the time of the deluge was appointed and could not be delayed, and that the people had to submit to God.

God commanded Noah to build a ship, the Ark, and as he was building it, the chieftains passed him and mocked him. Upon its completion, the ship is said to be loaded with pairs of every animal, and Noah's household, and a group of believers who did submit to God. The people who denied the message of Noah, including one of his own sons, drowned. The final resting place of the ship was referred to as "Al-Jūdiyy" or a "Munzalanm-Mubārakan". Noah is called a grateful servant. Both Noah and Abraham were taught the prophethood and the scripture. According to a Shia tafsir (exegesis), God commanded Noah to take all species that he needed on the ship. The commentary by Prophetic descendants explains the verse to mean eight animals.

Traditional narrative in Islam
According to Islam, he was a prophet, sent to warn mankind of that region and his people to change their ways. He conveyed the message for over 950 years. Islamic literature recounts that in the Generations of Adam, many men and women continued to follow Adam's original teachings, worshiping God alone and remaining righteous. Among Adam's descendants there were many brave and pious men, greatly loved and revered by their respective communities. Exegesis goes on to narrate that, upon the death of these elders, people felt enormous grief and some felt prompted to make statues of these people in remembrance of them. Then gradually, through the generations many forgot what such statues were for and began to worship them, (as the Shaytan (Satan) slowly deceived each generation) along with many other idols. In order to guide the people, God appointed Noah with the duty of being the next prophet to humanity.

Early preaching
According to Islamic belief, Noah began preaching to his people both verbally and by example. He would praise God consistently and he urged his people to do the same, warning his tribe of the punishment they would face if they did not mend their ignorant ways. The Qur'an states that Noah repeatedly told his people:"O my people, worship God; you have no deity other than Him. Indeed, I fear for you the punishment of a tremendous Day!"

Early on, a few were moved by Noah's words but the powerful and wealthy members of the tribe refused to hear his call. The unbelievers at the time were impelled to rebel by various evil motives. Firstly, they were extremely envious and jealous of men superior to them in any way. Secondly, the people were ignorant of the weak and lowly, who were frequently superior intellectually, morally and spiritually. As a result of their ignorance, they were arrogant and mocked all who they felt were inferior to them. Saying "Are we to believe you, when those who follow you are the most abject of people?" Noah responded: "Their judgment rests only with my Lord, if you could perceive." When Noah preached the faith of God to them, all they did was revile the messenger, abuse the message and call the whole warning a lie. He then went on to explain the Message in greater depth, ensuring them that it was not a message of destruction but it was a message with the mercy from God, and that their acts would lead to destruction if they did not accept the faith. He questioned them, asking why they would not accept what would benefit them in the near future. Noah went onto further, and told his community that he asked of no reward from them, telling them his only reward would be from God. But his people threatened him with being stoned.

Accusation
As time passed, Noah became firmer in his preaching. When the unbelievers began insulting those who accepted God's message, believing that Noah would send those faithful away to attract the wealthy unbelievers, Noah revealed that they - the arrogant and ignorant rich - were the wicked and sinful ones. His people accused him of being soothsayer or diviner. Noah declared that he was by no means a mere fortune-teller, pretending to reveal secrets which are not worth revealing. Noah also denied accusations claiming he was an angel, always maintaining that he was a human messenger. When the people refused to acknowledge their sinfulness Noah told them that it was not Noah, but God that would punish them - however God pleased.

Prayer
The Quran states that Noah prayed to God, telling him that his preaching only made his people disbelieve further. Noah told God how they had closed their minds to accepting the message, so that the light of the truth should not affect their thinking. Noah told God how he had used all the resources of the classical preacher, conveying the message both in public places and with individuals in private. Noah spoke of how he had told the people the rewards they would receive if they became righteous, namely that God would supply plentiful rain as a blessing, and that God would also guarantee them an increase in children and wealth.

Building of the Ark
According to the Quran, one day, Noah received a revelation from God, in which he was told that no one would believe the message now aside from those who have already submitted to God. Noah's frustration at the defiance of his people led him to ask God to not leave even one sinner upon earth. Although there is no proof that God accepted his prayer (as there are many examples of accepted prayers, such as in case of Yunus, Lut (Lot), Suleyman (Solomon) etc., even Noah's prayer in some other shape was accepted), God decreed that a terrible flood would come (and yet, Qur'an doesn't say it came to cover whole Earth) and He ordered Noah to build a ship (Fulk) which would save him and the believers from this dreadful calamity. Ever obedient to God's instructions, Noah went out in search of material with which to build the vessel. When Noah began building the Ark, the people who saw him at work laughed at him even more than before. Their conclusion was that he was surely a madman – they could not find any other reason why a man would build a huge vessel when no sea or river was nearby. Although Noah was now very old, the aged patriarch continued to work tirelessly until, at last, the Ship was finished.

Family
Little is known of Noah's personal history before his call to prophecy. However, Ibn Kathir records him to have been the son of Lamech and grandson of Methuselah, one of the patriarchs from the Generations of Adam. Noah was neither the leader of the tribe nor a very rich man but, even before being called to prophecy, he worshiped God faithfully and was, in the words of the Qur'an, "a devotee most grateful".

Noah was married to a woman whose name is not mentioned in the Quran. Some Islamic historians such as Al-Tabari have suggested that the name of Noah's wife was Umzarah bint Barakil but this cannot be confirmed. Most Muslims simply call her by her midrashic name Naamah. Islamic scholars agree that Noah had four sons whose names were Ham, Shem, Yam and Japheth. According to the Quran, one of Noah's sons was a disbeliever  who had pretended faith in front of Noah and who refused to come aboard the Ark, instead preferring to climb a mountain, where he drowned. It is agreed among most Islamic scholars that Yam was the one who drowned; the other three remained believers.

The Quran states that Noah's wife was not a believer with him so she did not join him. The sons of Noah are not expressly mentioned in the Qur'an, except for the fact that one of the sons was among the people who did not follow his own father, not among the believers and thus was washed away in the flood. Also the Qur'an indicates a great calamity, enough to have destroyed Noah's people, but to have saved him and his generations to come.
Noah's wife (Naamah) is referred to in the Qur'an as an evil woman. When God emphasizes upon the notion that everyone is for themselves on the Day of Judgement and that marital relations will not be to your aid when the judgement takes place, the Qur'an says:

 In contrast, the wife of the Pharaoh of the Exodus, Asiya, and Mary, the mother of Jesus, are referred to as among the best of women. This adds to the notion that, on the Last Day, everyone will be judged according to their own deeds. The "Stories of The Prophets" explain that the son who declined to embark was a non-believer.

In culture

Arkeology

Interest in Noah's ark has led to a number expeditions being made to find it in the modern age (or "arkeology" as they are informally known), even though it is not confirmed by the scientific community to have been found, as of now. These expeditions have been made in the Anatolian region, in what is now the Republic of Turkey, and the following sites are where the ark is thought to have landed:

Ashure

There is a Turkish dessert in remembrance of Noah, which is called Ashure or "Noah's pudding". It is made out of grains, nuts, and dried and fresh fruits. These are believed to be the few ingredients left on the ark, used by Noah and his family to celebrate the end of the flood.

Tomb

There are several sites that are claimed to be the Tomb of Noah:
 Noah's Mausoleum in Cizre, Şırnak, Turkey
 Noah's Mausoleum (Sunni Islam) in Nakhchivan, Azerbaijan
 Imam Ali Mosque (Shia Islam), Najaf, Iraq
 Al-Karak, Jordan
 Karak Nuh, Beqaa, Lebanon

References in the Quran
 "The Thankful" Noah: 

See also
 Biblical narratives and the Qur'an
 Corduene / Kurdistan
 Epic of Gilgamesh
 Flood myth
 List
 İlandağ of the Lesser Caucasus in Nakhchivan, Azerbaijan
 Muhammad in Islam
 Seven Laws of Noah
 The Sinjar Mountains in Nineveh Governorate, Iraq
 Stories of The Prophets

References

External links
 Mount Judi – A Mountain Where Hazrat Noah (A.S) Ark Rested
 Resting place of the Ark of Nuh (upon him be peace)
 Ararat or Judi?

Cultural depictions of Noah
Prophets of the Quran
Hebrew Bible prophets of the Quran